Caminos cruzados (English title: Crossed roads) is a Mexican telenovela produced by Herval Rossano for Televisa in 1994.

Mariana Levy and Ariel López Padilla starred as protagonists, while Margarita Gralia starred as main antagonist.

Plot 
Patricia is a sensitive and intelligent woman who starts working in the firm Ambrosio and Caesar Augustus (father and son). Both fall in love with her, but César Augusto breaks up with his girlfriend, Valeria and marries her. Patricia and Cesar Augusto, however, become separated. They meet again later having completely different lives: she is a working woman and he is married to another woman.

Cast 
 
Mariana Levy as Patricia Álvarez
Ariel López Padilla as César Augusto Jiménez y Cisneros
Margarita Gralia as Emma Ulloa de Jiménez y Cisneros
Roberto Vander as Ambrosio Jiménez y Cisneros
Carmen Amezcua as Mónica Valle de García
Octavio Galindo as Pedro Álvarez
Rosa María Bianchi as Alicia "Licha" Fernández de Álvarez
Javier Gómez as Mario Santander
Isabel Andrade as Celia Álvarez de Soles
Odiseo Bichir as Orlando Soles
Héctor Cruz Lara as Reynaldo Álvarez
Norma Lazareno as Gigi Dumont
Tania Helfgott as Valeria Dumont
Arath de la Torre as Rubén Soles
Eduardo Rivera as Diego Aranda
Gerardo Murguía as Manuel Burgos-Ulloa
Maricruz Nájera as Elsa
Dacia Arcaráz as Marilú
Laura Forastieri as Gaby Morales
Luis Javier as Leoncio Salazar
Gastón Tuset as Dr. Steve Miller
Mercedes Molto as Jacqueline "Jackie"
Martha Navarro as Silvia Márquez
Raquel Pankowsky as Inés Fernández
David Rencoret as Rafael Morales Díaz
Lucy Tovar as Rocío Navarro
Eva Prado as Julia Aragón
Monserrat Gallosa as Elenita Álvarez
Regina Torné as Katya
Ricardo Blume as Olegario Noguere
Hilda Aguirre as Lilia
Mónika Sánchez as Lucía
Vanessa Angers as Odette
Janet Pineda as Anita Valle
Marcos Valdés as Carlos Marchand
Raúl Azkenazi as Pérez
Mario Carballido as Juan Eduardo Linares
Janet Ruiz as Sandra Espinoza
Paulina Lazareno as Marisol
Claudia Abrego as Jennifer
Bárbara Córcega as Dulce María
Clara María Diar as Luisa Aranda
Surya MacGregor as Olga Burgos
Eric del Castillo as Roberto
Patricia Lukin as Rosita
Claudia Cañedo as Juanita
Carlos Espinoza as José
Teo Tapia as Gerardo
Ricardo Vera as Ramírez
Anita Klesky as Nurse
Rolando Valenzuela
John Knuckey
David Guzmán
Renato Munster
Claudia Campos
Graciela Estrada
Francisco Fandino
Rubén Morales
Mario Prudomme
Darwin Solano
Nelson Velázquez
Elías Rubio
Manuel Benitez

References

External links

1995 telenovelas
Mexican telenovelas
1995 Mexican television series debuts
1995 Mexican television series endings
Television shows set in Mexico City
Televisa telenovelas
Mexican television series based on Brazilian television series
Spanish-language telenovelas